Hollow is an EP/DVD release from alternative metal band Digital Summer. It was released on March 31, 2008, and featured the single "Rescue Me".

Track listing
Disc 1
"Whatever It Takes" (Acoustic) – 3:40
"Use Me" (Acoustic) – 4:27
"Suffocate" (Acoustic) – 3:59
"Sweet Misery" (Acoustic) – 4:55
"Rescue Me" – 3:30
"Worth the Pain" – 5:41

Disc 2
"Rescue Me" music video
Live concert footage
Behind the scenes

Miscellaneous information

The first disc includes acoustic versions of "Whatever it Takes" and "Suffocate," both tracks from their first release  Cause and Effect along with 4 brand new tracks.  The second disc features a music video for the song "Rescue Me," live concert footage, and footage from behind the scenes.
The music video for "Rescue Me" was filmed and produced by Motion Army.  The storyboard for the video included a scene of a car accident and featured both friends and co-workers of the band.

Personnel

Kyle Winterstein - Vocals, Guitar
Raymond Amparan - Guitar
Johnmark Cenfield - Guitar
Anthony Hernandez- Bass
Chris Carlson - Drums
Larry Elyea, Mind's Eye Digital - Producer and Engineer

Digital Summer albums
2007 EPs